Enmund v. Florida, 458 U.S. 782 (1982), is a United States Supreme Court case. It was a 5–4 decision in which the United States Supreme Court applied its capital proportionality principle, to set aside the death penalty for the driver of a getaway car, in a robbery-murder of an elderly Floridian couple.

Background 
While Earl Enmund sat outside in the getaway car, his accomplices Sampson and Jeanette Armstrong rang the doorbell of Thomas and Eunice Kersey, who lived at a farmhouse in Central Florida. When Thomas Kersey answered, Sampson Armstrong held him at gunpoint while Jeanette took his money. Eunice came out with a gun and shot Jeanette, wounding her. Sampson shot back and killed both of the Kerseys. The Armstrongs took all the Kerseys' money and then went back to the getaway car Enmund was driving.  

Enmund and the Armstrongs were indicted for first-degree murder and robbery. The judge instructed the jury that under Florida law, killing a human being while engaged in the perpetration or in the attempt to perpetrate a robbery is first-degree murder. Jeanette and Sampson Armstrong were convicted of first-degree murder. At a separate penalty hearing, the trial judge found that the murders were committed for pecuniary gain and were especially heinous, atrocious, or cruel, and no statutory mitigating factors applied, and then sentenced Enmund to death. On appeal, the Florida Supreme Court rejected Enmund's contention that his death sentence was inappropriate because he did not kill or intend to kill the Kerseys. It held that the "felony murder rule and the law of principals combine to make a felon generally responsible for the lethal acts of his co-felon."

Opinion of the Court 
Justice White  delivered the opinion of the Court.   The question before the Court was whether death is a valid penalty under the Eighth and Fourteenth Amendments for one who neither took life, attempted to take life, nor intended to take life.  The majority found that the record did not support a finding that Enmund killed or attempted to kill the Kerseys, and the record did not support a finding that Enmund intended to participate in the killing or facilitate the killing. Accordingly, the Court held the imposition of a sentence of death upon Enmund was prohibited by the Eighth Amendment because Enmund only "aided and abetted a felony in the course of which a murder is committed by others but who does not himself kill, attempt to kill, or intend that a killing take place or that lethal force will be employed."

Concurring opinion 
Justice Brennan delivered a concurring opinion and stated that the death penalty is a cruel and unusual punishment prohibited by the Eighth Amendment in all circumstances.

Dissent 
Justice O'Connor, joined by Chief Justice Burger, Justice Powell, and Justice Rehnquist, delivered the dissenting opinion, on the basis that the majority opinion interferes with state criteria for assessing guilt.

See also 
 Tison v. Arizona
 Felony murder and the death penalty in the United States

References

External links 
 

United States Supreme Court cases
United States Supreme Court cases of the Burger Court
Cruel and Unusual Punishment Clause and death penalty case law
Capital punishment in Florida
1982 in United States case law